Zerich Capital Management is one of the oldest and largest investment financial companies in Russia (according to the list provided by the Moscow Exchange in 2018, the company was one of one of the five largest stock brokers in its derivatives market). The core divisions are: securities sales and trading, investment banking, and asset management. It has been a part of Freedom Finance — an international investment company — since 2020.

Zerich Capital Management (ZCM) is the successor to «Trust-service» investing company that was set up in 1993, at the very beginning of the stock market establishment in Russian Federation.

Company Structure

Zerich Financial Group consists of:

 Zerich Investment Company - provides a full range of financial services run through a Russia-based broker-dealer center  including brokerage, on-line trading, desk trading etc.;
 Zerich Asset Management - a complex domestic fund and wealth management services;
 Zerich Bank - a credit institution;
 Zerich Analytics - a capital market advisory;

References

External links
 Official web-site
 ZCM market advisory

Russian investment banks
Companies based in Moscow
Banks established in 1993